Valeda is an unincorporated community in Labette County, Kansas, United States.

History
Valeda was platted in 1886.

References

Further reading

External links
 Labette County maps: Current, Historic, KDOT

Unincorporated communities in Labette County, Kansas
Unincorporated communities in Kansas